Chaetostachydium is a genus of flowering plants in the family Rubiaceae. It is endemic to New Guinea.

Species
 Chaetostachydium barbatum Ridsdale
 Chaetostachydium filiforme Ridsdale
 Chaetostachydium versteegii (Valeton) Airy Shaw

References

External links
Chaetostachydium in the World Checklist of Rubiaceae

Rubiaceae genera
Psychotrieae
Endemic flora of New Guinea